José Emilio Perea Trujillo (born 19 January 1983) is a Mexican professional boxer. He's currently the WBC FECARBOX lightweight Champion and was the WBC FECARBOX super featherweight Champion.

Professional career
On February 20, 2010 Perea beat Panama's Julio Camano by 9th round T.K.O. in Mérida, Yucatán, Mexico.

References

External links

1983 births
Boxers from Hidalgo (state)
Lightweight boxers
Living people
Mexican male boxers
Sportspeople from Pachuca